Paula Barra was a German film actress. She starred in several films including the 1918 Max Nivelli film Pathways to Life, the 1919 film The Peace Rider, and the 1920 film The Air Pirates

Filmography
The Lord of Hohenstein (1917)
Pathways of Life (1918)
The Peace Rider (Der Friedensreiter) (1919) as Victorine de Brion
Der Große Coup (1919) directed by Harry Piel
Christian Wahnschaffe (1920)
The Air Pirates (Die Luftpiraten) (1920)
The Pink Jersey (Das rosa Trikot) (1920) directed by Léo Lasko

External links
Paula Barra on IMDb

References

German actresses